ʿĪsā ibn Aḥmad al-Rāzī (died 980) was a Muslim historian who wrote a continuation of the chronicle Akhbār mulūk al-Andalus, the first narrative history of Islamic rule in Spain, which was written by his father, Aḥmad ibn Muḥammad ibn Mūsa al-Rāzī.

The Arabic version of the Akhbār mulūk al-Andalus along with ʿĪsā's contribution to it is now lost. All that survives of ʿĪsā's part are quotations in other Arabic histories. It appears that he began with the accession of ʿAbd al-Raḥmān III as emir in 912. His sections are richer in detail than his father's and reflect the cultural interests of the court of ʿAbd al-Raḥmān and his successor, al-Ḥakam II. The work may have been dedicated to the latter, who died in 976. There is evidence of the use of Christian sources, as in the use of the Spanish era in addition to the Islamic era. ʿĪsā may have had access to the history of the Franks by Bishop Gotmar that ʿAbd al-Raḥmān had commissioned. Ibn Ḥayyān quotes ʿĪsā's history of al-Ḥakam's reign from 971 to 975 in his Muqtabis. Of Aḥmad and ʿĪsā, Ibn Ḥayyān writes, "Together they endowed the Andalusis with a science [historiography] they had not hitherto practised with success."

Notes

References

Bibliography

980 deaths
10th-century historians from al-Andalus
10th-century Arabic writers
Writers of Iranian descent

es:Isa ibn Ahmad al-Razi